Rarities 1994–1999 is the second compilation album from rock group Silverchair released in December 2002 by Murmur/Sony Music Entertainment. It was originally a limited edition bonus disc packaged with the compilation, The Best Of: Volume 1 (December 2000), and was issued as a separate budget-priced album when the two-disc version was discontinued in 2002. The 2002 version featured new Neon Ballroom-themed artwork. As with the earlier collection, the band was not involved in compiling the tracks, having left Sony in early 2000.

Reception 

AllMusic's Johnny Loftus rated Rarities 1994–1999 as two out of five and felt it was "non-essential" for fans or even casual listeners of Silverchair, preferring their earlier compilation, The Best of Volume 1, as a retrospective release.

Track listing

References

Silverchair albums
Albums produced by Nick Launay
2002 compilation albums